Torah Jane Bright  (born 27 December 1986) is an Australian professional snowboarder. She is Australia's most successful Winter Olympian, former Olympic gold and silver medalist, two time X Games gold medalist, three time US Open winner, two time Global Open Champion, three time World Superpipe Champion, former TTR World Champion and recipient of the Best Female Action Sports Athlete at the ESPY awards. In 2014 Bright became the first Olympic athlete (male or female) to qualify for all three snowboarding disciplines; halfpipe, slopestyle  and boarder-cross.

Early life
Bright was born in Cooma, New South Wales on 27 December 1986, to parents Peter and Marion Bright; she is the fourth of five siblings. Her parents named her "Torah" after her sister Rowena learned from her Jewish piano teacher that the name referred to the Jewish name for the first five books of the Tanakh and meant "bearer of a great spiritual message" and suggested the name for her new sister.

Bright grew up in Cooma, New South Wales and attended Cooma North Public School at the base of the Snowy Mountains. She started out as a downhill ski racer.

Bright's brother, Ben, is also a professional snowboarder and was her coach. Her older sister, Rowena, competed in the 2002 Salt Lake City Olympics in alpine skiing.

Career
Bright uses a goofy stance.

Bright finished 30th overall at the 2005 World Championships in Whistler, Canada and was runner-up for the World Cup title during the 2003–04 season.

Bright entered only three World Cup events during the 2004–05 season, both in February at the 2006 Winter Olympic venue of Bardonecchia.  She placed third in both events, qualifying for the Australian Olympic team.

In 2006, Bright earned a silver medal at the Winter X Games in Aspen, Colorado.  She returned the following year, winning the gold medal in the women's superpipe event. She is the first Australian snowboarder to ever win gold at the Winter X Games (11), beating Winter Olympic medalists Gretchen Bleiler and Hannah Teter.

In 2007, Bright took first at the Nissan X-Trail Nippon Open in the women's halfpipe, giving her back-to-back wins in two consecutive competitions. At the 2007 World Super Pipe Championships in Park City, Utah, Bright won first place, beating 2002 Olympic gold medalist Kelly Clark.  In late 2007, she made the podium for both events in the Roxy Chicken Jam, the final event in the TTR (Ticket to Ride) Snowboard Tour, where she became the 2007 TTR world champion.

In 2010, at the Winter Olympics at Vancouver, Bright was chosen to carry the flag for Australia at the opening ceremonies, and qualified for the no. 1 spot for the final of the women's halfpipe, despite suffering two concussions beforehand in training. Crashing out in her first run in the final, Bright was the first competitor to make a second run. With a successful second run, she posted a score of 45.0, which remained the highest score through the field's second run. Bright became the fourth Australian to win a Winter Olympics gold medal.

In 2013 at the Winter X Games XVII in Aspen, Colorado, Bright came in fourth in the superpipe behind medalists  Kelly Clark, Elena Hight, and Arielle Gold.

In 2014 at the Winter Olympics at Sochi, having entered an unprecedented triple of slopestyle, halfpipe, and boarder-cross, Bright finished 7th in the inaugural women's slopestyle final and went on to win silver with a score of 91.50 in the women's halfpipe. This was Australia's first medal at the 2014 Winter Olympics. The medal also saw Bright surpass Alisa Camplin to become Australia's most successful Winter Olympics athlete.

Bright was a participant in the fourteenth season of Dancing with the Stars.

In 2020 Bright appeared in the documentary film Out of Bounds, snowboarding some of the most extreme reaches of the planet: "I came out of the journey totally inspired by nature and people. There are so many people who do care and are doing their part to create awareness and change. There is a shift in consciousness and it's a beautiful thing to witness."

Endorsements
Bright has a lifelong sponsorship with Rhythm Snowsports, located in her home town Cooma. She also has a head-to-toe sponsorship with Roxy, the female-specific brand of action-sports company Quiksilver. For the 2008–09 season, she worked to expand her career into design, working on a new addition to the Roxy's women's line, dubbed the "Bright Series," which includes her snowboard, the Roxy Eminence. Her other sponsors include Subway and Boost Mobile.

Competition results

2003
 Runner Up for the World Cup Title – 2003–04 season

2004
 1st – Half-Pipe – FIS World Cup, Turin
 2nd – World Cup, Whistler, British Columbia
 2nd – FIS World Cup, Juetsu, Japan
 3rd – FIS World Cup, Sapporo, Japan
 2nd – Roxy pro, Les Arc, France

2005
 1st – Arctic Challenge, Tromsø, Norway
 2nd – US Open
 1st – Nippon Open
 3rd – FIS World Cup
 3rd – Slopestyle – Roxy Chicken Jam (USA)
 30th – 2005 World Championships in Whistler, Canada

2006
 1st – Half-pipe – US Open
 1st – Superpipe – World Super-pipe Championships Park City, Utah.
 1st – Vans Cup

2007
 Burton Global Open Champion
 TTR World Snowboard Tour Champion 06/07
 1st – Half-pipe – Burton New Zealand Open
 4th – Slopestyle – Burton New Zealand Open
 2nd – Half-pipe – Roxy Chicken Jam (USA)
 3rd – Slopestyle – Roxy Chicken Jam (USA)
 2nd – Slopestyle – Burton US Open
 3rd – Half-pipe – Burton US Open
 1st – Superpipe – World Super-pipe Championships
 1st – Half-pipe – X-Trail Nippon Open
 1st – Half-pipe – EXPN Winter X Games 11

2008
 2nd – TTR World Snowboard Tour 07/08
 1st – Superpipe – World Superpipe Championships – Park City, UT.
 2nd – Super-pipe – EXPN Winter X Games 12 (Aspen)
 1st – Superpipe – Nippon Open Japan
 1st – Superpipe – Burton US Open, Vermont
 Burton Global Open Champion

2009
 1st – Superpipe – Toyota Championship (Winter Dew Tour)
 1st – Superpipe – EXPN Winter X games 13 (Aspen, Colorado)

2010
 1st – Half-pipe – Winter Olympics (2010 Winter Olympics)

2013
 1st – Superpipe – iON Mountain Championships (Winter Dew Tour)

2014
 2nd – Half-pipe – Winter Olympics (2014 Winter Olympics)
 7th – Slopestyle – Winter Olympics (2014 Winter Olympics)

Personal life
Bright is a member of the Church of Jesus Christ of Latter-day Saints.

Bright was married to American pro snowboarder Jake Welch from 2010 to 2013.

Bright married snowboarder Angus Thomson in September 2015.

References

External links
 Religion gives Olympian Bright a boost
 Torah Bright wins Women's Halfpipe at 2010 Winter Olympics
 ROXY Team Rider Torah Bright Official Bio
Stepping Out Of Bounds With Torah Bright

1986 births
Living people
People from Cooma
Sportswomen from New South Wales
Australian female snowboarders
Olympic snowboarders of Australia
Snowboarders at the 2006 Winter Olympics
Snowboarders at the 2010 Winter Olympics
Snowboarders at the 2014 Winter Olympics
Australian Latter Day Saints
X Games athletes
Olympic gold medalists for Australia
Olympic silver medalists for Australia
Olympic medalists in snowboarding
Medalists at the 2010 Winter Olympics
Medalists at the 2014 Winter Olympics
Australian expatriate sportspeople in the United States
Recipients of the Medal of the Order of Australia